S

The Preferential Payments in Bankruptcy Amendment Act 1897 (61 Vict. c.19) was an Act of Parliament of the United Kingdom, affecting UK insolvency law. It amended the category of "preferential payments" for rates, taxes and wages, to take priority over a floating charge in an insolvent company's assets.

Section 1 of the Preferential Payments in Bankruptcy Act 1888 first introduced the concept. It was amended by section 2 of the Preferential Payments in Bankruptcy Amendment Act 1897.

The provisions were re-enacted in the Companies (Consolidation) Act 1908, the Companies Act 1929 and the Companies Act 1948.

Its provisions were largely ineffective as a floating charge would invariably crystallise into a fixed charge prior to enforcement.  It was not until the Insolvency Act 1986 that the definition of floating charge was expanded to include any charge which was created as a fixed charge (i.e. irrespective of subsequent crystallisation).

See also
Re Barleycorn Enterprises Ltd [1970] Ch 465 
UK insolvency law
UK bankruptcy law
History of bankruptcy law

Notes

Insolvency law of the United Kingdom
United Kingdom company law
United Kingdom Acts of Parliament 1897
1890s economic history